Álvaro Adrián Núñez Moreira (born 11 May 1973) is a Uruguayan retired footballer who played as a goalkeeper.

He also has a Spanish passport, having spent over a decade playing in the country mainly with Numancia (eight years, 83 La Liga games).

Club career
Núñez was born in Rivera. After playing in his country with Centro Atlético Fénix, C.A. Cerro and C.A. Rentistas he moved to Spain in 1999, signing with CD Numancia. An undisputed starter in his first two seasons (both in La Liga, playing a combined 72 games) he started struggling for a starting XI berth onwards, and was majorly a backup in the rest of his Soria career, which was almost entirely spent in the second division.

After nine matches in 2007–08, as Numancia returned to the top flight after three years, Núñez left the club but stayed in the country, joining lowly CD Guadalajara. He retired in June 2011, at the age of 38.

International career
Núñez won one cap for Uruguay, and was a backup at the 1999 Copa América.

Honours

Club

Numancia
Segunda División: 2007–08

International

Uruguay
Copa América: Runner-up 1999

References

External links

1973 births
Living people
Uruguayan people of Spanish descent
Uruguayan footballers
Association football goalkeepers
Uruguayan Primera División players
Centro Atlético Fénix players
C.A. Cerro players
C.A. Rentistas players
La Liga players
Segunda División players
Segunda División B players
CD Numancia players
CD Guadalajara (Spain) footballers
Uruguay international footballers
1999 Copa América players
Uruguayan expatriate footballers
Expatriate footballers in Spain
Uruguayan expatriate sportspeople in Spain